John Murray or Murry may refer to:

Arts and media

Literature and music 
John Murray (publishing house), a British publishing house, founded by John Murray (1745–1793)
John Murray (publisher, born 1778) (died 1843), second head of the publishing house
John Murray III (1808–1892), third head of the publishing house
John Murray (Australian writer) (born 1963), Australian epidemiologist and writer
John Murray (novelist) (born 1950), British novelist
John Middleton Murry (1889–1957), writer
John Middleton Murry Jr. (1926–2002), English writer
John Murry (musician) (born 1979), American musician
John Murray Graham (1809–1881), Scottish historian, in early life John Murray

Screen, radio and performing arts
John Murray (Irish broadcaster) (born 1964), Irish broadcaster and journalist
John Murray (playwright) (1906–1984), American playwright, co-author of Room Service
John Murray (sports broadcaster) (born 1966), English sports commentator
John T. Murray (1886–1957), Australian-born actor
Johnny Murray (voice actor), voice actor known for Bosko, the first star of Warner Brothers cartoons
John B. Murray (filmmaker), Australian filmmaker and author

Sportspeople

Association football
John Murray (footballer, born 1865) (1865–1922), Scottish international footballer who played club football for Vale of Leven, Sunderland, and Blackburn Rovers
John Murray (footballer, born 1874) (c. 1874–1933), Scottish international footballer who played club football for Renton and Dundee
John Murray (footballer, born 1927) (born 1927), England footballer who played club football for Gillingham
John Murray (footballer, born 1948) (born 1948), English footballer
John Murray (Irish footballer) (fl. 1890s), Irish footballer

Other
John Murray (athlete) (1881–?), Irish Olympic athlete
Jack Murray (Australian footballer) (fl. 1935–1949), Australian rules footballer
John Murray (boxer) (born 1984), lightweight English boxer
John Murray (cricketer, born 1935) (1935–2018), English cricketer
John Murray (cricketer, born 1873) (1873–1916), Scottish cricketer and RAF officer
John Murray (cricketer, born 1882) (1882–1917), Scottish cricketer and British Army officer
John Murray (ice hockey, born 1924) (1924–2017), British ice hockey player
John Murray (ice hockey, born 1987), American ice hockey player
John Murray (sports broadcaster) (born 1966), English broadcaster for BBC Radio 5 Live
Johnny Murray (1898–1954), Irish footballer during the 1920s
John A. Murray (jockey) in Singapore Gold Cup

Law and politics

United Kingdom and Britain 
John Murray, 1st Earl of Tullibardine (died 1609), Scottish courtier and leader of the Clan Murray
John Murray, 1st Earl of Annandale (died 1640), Scottish courtier and MP for Guildford
John Murray, Lord Bowhill (died 1714), MP in the first Parliament of Great Britain 1707–1708
John Murray (died 1753), British MP for the Linlithgow Burghs, 1725–1734, Selkirkshire, 1734–1753
Lord John Murray (1711–1787), British General and MP for Perthshire, 1734–1761
John Murray of Broughton (c. 1718–1777), Jacobite and secretary to Prince Charles Edward Stuart
John Murray (1726–1800), British MP for the Linlithgow Burghs, 1754–1761
John Murray, 3rd Duke of Atholl (1729–1774), MP for Perthshire 1761–1764, Lord of the Isle of Man from 1764 to 1765
John Murray (colonial administrator) (c. 1739–1824), governor of the Cape Breton colony in today's Nova Scotia
John Murray (British diplomat) (c. 1712–1775), Ambassador to the Ottoman Empire 1765–1775
Sir John Murray, 8th Baronet (c. 1768–1827), British MP for Wootton Bassett 1807–1811, Weymouth & Melcombe Regis 1811–1818
John Murray, 5th Duke of Atholl (1778–1846), British Army officer and landowner in Scotland
John Murray, Lord Murray (1779–1859), British MP for the Leith Burghs, 1832–1839
Sir Hubert Murray (John Hubert Plunkett Murray, 1861–1940), judge and Lieutenant-Governor of Papua
John Murray, 11th Duke of Atholl (1929–2012), British peer

Scotland 
John Murray, 1st Marquess of Atholl (1631–1703), leading Scottish royalist
John Murray, 1st Duke of Atholl (1660–1724), Scottish nobleman and politician
John Murray, 4th Earl of Dunmore (1730–1809), colonial governor of Virginia and later the Bahamas
John Murray, 4th Duke of Atholl (1755–1830), Scottish peer
John Wilson Murray (1840–1906), Scottish-born police detective who worked in the US and Canada during the late 19th/early 20th centuries
John Murray (Liberal politician) (1879–1964), Scottish civil servant, university administrator and Liberal Party politician
John Murray, Lord Dervaird (1935–2015), Scottish judge

Ireland 
John Murray (Monaghan MP) (1707–1743), MP for County Monaghan 1741–43
John L. Murray (judge) (1943–2023), Irish judge

United States 
John Murray (Massachusetts politician) (1715?–1794), representative to the Great and General Court of the Province of Massachusetts Bay
John Murray (congressman) (1768–1834), United States Representative from Pennsylvania
John F. Murray (politician) (1862–1928), second borough president of The Bronx
John L. Murray (representative) (1806–1842), U.S. Representative from Kentucky
John Porry Murray (1830–1895), Confederate politician
John E. Murray Jr. (1932–2015), professor of law and Chancellor of Duquesne University in Pittsburgh, Pennsylvania
John S. Murray (Iowa politician) (born 1939), American politician from the state of Iowa
John S. Murray (Washington politician) (1925–2007), American politician in the state of Washington

Australia 
John Murray (pastoralist) (1837–1917), member of the Queensland Parliament from 1888 to 1903
John Murray (Victorian politician) (1851–1916), Premier of Victoria from 1909 to 1912
John Murray (Queensland politician) (1915–2009), member of the Australian House of Representatives from 1958 to 1961
John Murray (New South Wales politician) (born 1939), member of the New South Wales Legislative Assembly from 1982 to 2003

Other 
John Murray (judge) (1888–1976), Chief Justice of Southern Rhodesia from 1955 to 1961
J. R. Murray (John Rose Murray, 1898–1991), Ceylonese accountant and politician in colonial Ceylon

Military
John Murray, 2nd Earl of Dunmore (1685–1752), Scottish peer and British Army general
Sir John Murray, 8th Baronet (c. 1768–1827), general, led a brigade under the Duke of Wellington in the Peninsular War
John B. Murray (general) (1822–1884), American general
John Ivor Murray (1824–1903), Scottish surgeon who practised in China, Hong Kong and then in Sebastopol in the Crimean War
Sir John Irvine Murray (1826–1902), Scottish general who raised the 14th Murray's Jat Lancers
John Murray (native police officer) (1827–1876), Native Police officer in Queensland, Australia
John Murray (Irish soldier) (1837–1911), Irish recipient of the Victoria Cross
John Murray (Australian Army general) (1892–1951), general in the Australian Army
John M. Murray, United States Army general
John E. Murray, United States Army general
Sir John Macgregor Murray, 1st Baronet, Scottish army officer

Religion and theology
John Murray (minister) (1741–1815), minister and inspirational figure sometimes called the "founder of American Universalism"
John Gardner Murray (1857–1929), Episcopal bishop of Maryland and Presiding Bishop
John Owen Farquhar Murray (1858–1944), Anglican clergyman and master of Selwyn College, Cambridge
John Gregory Murray (1877–1956), Roman Catholic archbishop of Saint Paul
John Murray (theologian) (1898–1975), Scottish-born Calvinist theologian and Presbyterian minister
John W. Murray (died 1996), pastor, evangelist, and president of Shelton College
John Murray (provost of St Mary's Cathedral, Glasgow) (1901–1973), priest in the Scottish Episcopal Church
John Courtney Murray (1904–1967), Jesuit priest and theologian
John Murray (archdeacon of Dublin) (1916–2005), priest in the Church of Ireland
John Murray (archdeacon of Cashel)
John Murray (dean of Killaloe), Anglican priest in Ireland
John Walton Murray, Irish Anglican priest and author

Science
John Murray (physician) (1778–1820), Scottish geologist and lecturer in various scientific subjects
John Murray (science lecturer) (c. 1786–1851), Scottish geologist
Sir John Murray (oceanographer) (1841–1914), Scots-Canadian marine biologist credited as the "father of modern oceanography"
John O'Kane Murray (1847–1885), Irish physician and author
John Murray (geographer) (1883–1940), Scottish educator and author
John F. Murray (1927–2020), American pulmonologist and researcher
John Murray (professor of robotics)

Others

John Murray (Australian explorer) (c. 1775–c. 1807), seaman
John Murray (abolitionist) (1787–1849), leading light in Glasgow Emancipation Society
John Murray (Naperville founder) (1785–1868), one of the original settlers of Naperville, Illinois in 1831
John Murray (sheep breeder), father (c. 1812–1886), and son (1841–1908), breeders of merino sheep in South Australia
John Lamb Murray (1838–1908), Scottish architect
John Bunion Murray (1908–1988), self-taught artist in Glascock County, Georgia
John Clark Murray, Scottish philosopher and professor

See also 
Jon Murray (disambiguation)
Jack Murray (disambiguation)
Jock Murray (disambiguation)